Marisa Polvino is an American film producer based in New York City. She is the co-founder of Straight Up Films, and has been the co-owner of the company since 2014.

Career

Polvino headed production at Revere Pictures for several years, and in 2005 was part of GTO Productions. She then co-founded the boutique film and commercial company Straight Up Films in 2008,

Marisa Polvino has produced the films Outside Providence, The Education of Charlie Banks, The Door in the Floor, Brooklyn Rules, A Shot at Glory, and Manos sucias (executive producer) and I’ll Sleep When I am Dead (co-producer). In 2014, the film Manos Sucias screened at the Cannes Film Festival.

In 2015 Polvino developed the sci-fi thriller Apex (executive producer), with Barry Josephson, the political serio-comedy Prince of Providence, with Steven Soderbergh and written by David Mamet. She is one of several producers who worked on Transcendence with Broderick Johnson and Andrew Kosove of Alcon Entertainment and directed by Wally Pfister

In March 2021 Marisa Polvino and Kate Cohen launched Straight Up Impact, a sister company of Straight Up Films focused on positive impact productions.

Filmography

References

External links 
 

Year of birth missing (living people)
Living people
American film production company founders
American women film producers
American film producers
21st-century American women